Canals in Ukraine are mostly for irrigation or water supply. Most of them are supervised by the Canal Administration of the State Agency of water resources of Ukraine. As the rest of water resources canals compose the Water Fund of Ukraine and are included in the Water Cadastre (register) of Ukraine.

Most of the canals are in the basins of the Dnieper and Siversky Donets, with some in the Danube basin. Their main purpose is water supply, irrigation, and drainage of land; they are also used partially for fish farming and recreation.

Its construction started in 1957 for irrigation of the Kherson Oblast steppe regions and Crimea, as well as water supply to Simferopol, Sevastopol, other populated places, and the Kerch Industrial District.

Equally important is the Dnieper-Donbas Canal, which is for water supply of Kharkiv and cities of the Donets basin as well as land irrigation. It starts from the Dniprodzerzhynsk Water Reservoir on the Dnieper then runs through the valleys of the river Orel and Orelka towards the Krasnopavlivske Water Reservoir, then further to the Siversky Donets near the city of Izyum.

The canal was constructed in 1980 for irrigation of agricultural lands. It is also used for water supply to populated places. Around the lands of Askania Nova for environmental measures was built a vertical drainage around whole contour of the reserve.

It is designed for water supply of Kryvbas and irrigation of surrounding farmlands. It was built in 1957-1961 and reconstructed in 1975-1979.

Canals play a large role in the irrigation of agricultural lands. The biggest irrigation systems operate in the zone of the North Crimean Canal (irrigation area is over ) in Crimea and Kherson Oblast.

External links
 List of canals at the State Agency of water resources of Ukraine.
 Kurhanevych, L. Water cadastre.
 Water bodies of Ukraine: lakes, estuaries, reservoirs, marshes and canals

 
C